Chanson de Jérusalem (or Song of Jerusalem) is a 12th century French epic poem celebrating the 1099 Siege of Jerusalem by Christian crusaders during the First Crusade. It was translated and incorporated into the prose Spanish Gran conquista de Ultramar.

References  
 La conqueste de Jerusalem, Medieval literature archive (in French). 
 Nigel R. Thorp, ed., The Old French Crusade Cycle, vol. 6: La chanson de Jérusalem. University, Alabama: University of Alabama Press, 1992
 Susan B. Edgington, "Albert of Aachen and the Chansons de Geste" in John France, William G. Zajac, edd., The Crusades and their sources: essays presented to Bernard Hamilton (Aldershot: Ashgate, 1998) pp. 23–37.
 Filippo Andrei. "Alberto di Aachen e la Chanson de Jérusalem." Romance Philology 63 (2009): 1-69, special issue: Romania Mediterranea II.
 Filippo Andrei. "Rappresentazioni leggendarie e narrazioni storiche della Città santa nella Chanson de Jérusalem." In Federica Frediani, ed., The Mediterranean City Between Myth and Reality. Firenze: Nerbini, 2013. 89-108.
 Suzanne Duparc-Quioc, "La Chanson de Jérusalem et la Gran Conquista de Ultramar" in Romania 46:32–48, 1940
 Susan B. Edgington, "Albert of Aachen and the Chansons de Geste" in John France, William G. Zajac, edd., The Crusades and their sources: essays presented to Bernard Hamilton (Aldershot: Ashgate, 1998) pp. 23–37.
 Davide Esposito, "Il concetto di "vendetta" nella Chanson de Jérusalem", in V Ciclo di Studi Medievali. Atti del Convegno. 3-4 giugno 2019. Firenze, NUME - Gruppo di Ricerca sul Medioevo Latino. Lesmo, 2019, 546-551.
 Davide Esposito, "Millenarismo e Crociate: l'Apocalisse di Ramla nella Chanson de Jérusalem", Studia Orientalia Christiana, Collectanea 50-51
 Jean Subrenat, La Conquête de Jérusalem. Reflet d’une mystique du pèlerinage in Le mythe de Jérusalem du Moyen Age à la Renaissance, ed. Evelyne Berriat-Salvadore, 21–36. Saint-Étienne: Publications de l’Université de Saint-Étienne 1995

Chansons_de_geste
French poems
Medieval French literature
Crusade poetry